Rafael González Robles (born 25 October 1970), commonly known as Rafa, is a Spanish retired footballer who played as a goalkeeper.

11 of his professional seasons were spent at Oviedo and Málaga, but he only served as backup for ten of those. After retiring, he became a goalkeeper's coach, notably in England.

Football career
Born in Avilés, Asturias, Rafa started his career at Real Avilés Industrial in Segunda División. After the team's 1992 relegation, he moved to one of the biggest clubs in the region, Real Oviedo, but spent five seasons there (always in La Liga) without making more than three league appearances.

In the summer of 1997, Rafa joined Málaga CF, again meeting the same fate. However, he did appear in 31 games in his second year as the Andalusians promoted from Segunda División B to the top flight in only two years.

Rafa retired from football in 2007, after having played one season each for Cultural y Deportiva Leonesa, Sporting de Gijón, Oviedo (the club was now in Tercera División) and England's Coventry City. Previously, in the 2005 summer, he had an unsuccessful trial with Walsall, before securing a four-month contract at the Football League Championship team.

Following his retirement, Robles was immediately hired by another team in the country of his last club, joining Aston Villa as its goalkeeping coach in August 2007. He remained there until 2012, working with both the first team and academy's goalkeepers.

On 11 February 2013, Rafa joined the New York Red Bulls as goalkeeper coach.

Honours
Málaga
UEFA Intertoto Cup: 2002

References

External links

1970 births
Living people
People from Avilés
Spanish footballers
Footballers from Asturias
Association football goalkeepers
La Liga players
Segunda División players
Segunda División B players
Real Avilés CF footballers
Real Oviedo players
Málaga CF players
Cultural Leonesa footballers
Sporting de Gijón players
Coventry City F.C. players
Spain under-23 international footballers
Spanish expatriate footballers
Expatriate footballers in England
Aston Villa F.C. non-playing staff
New York Red Bulls non-playing staff